Maryborough railway station is located on the Mildura line in Victoria, Australia. It serves the town of Maryborough, and it opened on 7 July 1874.

The station is the terminus of V/Line Maryborough services from Ballarat.

Maryborough is a major junction, with cross country routes to Moolort and Ararat. The Avoca line from Ararat is a standard gauge line that becomes a dual gauge track when passing through Maryborough, with the dual gauge track operating as far north as Dunolly. There are the remains of dock platforms at both ends of the main platform.

History

Maryborough station opened on 7 July 1874, when a railway line from Castlemaine was provided. On 6 October of that year, the line was extended to Dunolly and, on 2 February 1875, the line from Clunes was extended. Like the town itself, the station was named after Maryborough in Ireland, which was suggested by James Daly, who was Assistant Gold Commissioner.

The current station building was erected in 1890, with 25 rooms and a clock tower, of red brick with stucco trimming. In 1895, Mark Twain visited Maryborough, which he dryly observed as being: "A railway station with a town attached". Some people believe bureaucratic error led to the station being built from plans for the station intended for Maryborough, Queensland (a much larger town), and others from Melbourne's Spencer Street station (now Southern Cross), as it was a much larger station than Spencer Street, in the state's capital city.

In 1967, a rail overpass replaced a level crossing at Tuaggra Street (Pyrenees Highway), located in the Down direction of the station. In 1969, boom barriers replaced interlocked gates at the Inkerman Street level crossing, located nearby in the Up direction of the station.

In 1988, track "A" and siding "C" was abolished, as well as a number of signal posts. A number of signals and crossovers were provided at the same time.

On 12 September 1993, the station was closed to passenger traffic, when The Vinelander service to Mildura was withdrawn and replaced by road coaches.

During 2006-2007, the station was restored by RBA Architects and Conservation Consultants, with repairs to the towers, clock, facade, portico, roof and guttering. Stage Two included slating, rendering, glazing and moulding repairs, to match the works conducted during the first stage of works.

In December 2008, as part of the Victorian Transport Plan, the State Government announced passenger rail services to Maryborough would resume. On 25 July 2010, services between Maryborough and Ballarat commenced.

In 2011, restoration works occurred on the station platform verandah.

Platforms and services

Maryborough has one platform. It is serviced by V/Line Maryborough line services.

Platform 1:
  services to and from Ballarat

Transport links

Maryborough Transit operates three routes via Maryborough station, under contract to Public Transport Victoria:
 : Maryborough (Napier Street) – Hedges
 : Maryborough (Napier Street) – Princes Park/Whirrakee
 : Maryborough (Napier Street) – Pascoe

V/Line operates road coaches via Maryborough station, from Melbourne and Ballarat to Donald and Mildura.

Gallery

References

External links
 Rail Geelong gallery
 Victorian Railway Stations gallery
 Melway map at street-directory.com.au
 

Railway stations in Australia opened in 1874
Regional railway stations in Victoria (Australia)
Maryborough, Victoria